Leonard George "Jack" Giles (17 June 1921 – 23 August 1994) was an Australian rules footballer who played with Sturt in the South Australian National Football League (SANFL), and cricketer, who represented South Australia.  He was appointed captain of Sturt in 1949.

In 1942 he enlisted in the Australian Defence Force, joining the 112th Australian Light Anti Aircraft Regiment, and in 1943 he played one game for Richmond in the Victorian Football League.

References

External links 		
		
	

1921 births
1994 deaths
Sturt Football Club players
Richmond Football Club players
Australian rules footballers from South Australia
Cricketers from South Australia
South Australia cricketers
Australian Army personnel of World War II
Australian Army soldiers